NBA InfoCenter is a professional social media outlet that reports news, trades and scores for the National Basketball Association. Since January 2016, NBA InfoCenter has given NBA fans the coverage of news on social media app Instagram, and has since expanded to Snapchat and Facebook. On December 4, 2016, the account reached 10,000 followers on Instagram

References

National Basketball Association
Social media